Casas de Bárcena is a village in the Valencian Community, Spain, part of the municipality of Valencia.

Towns in Spain
Populated places in the Province of Valencia
Geography of Valencia